Rear-Admiral Henry Hardyman Parker CB (born 20 December 1963) is a senior Royal Navy officer who served as Director (Carrier Strike).

Naval career
Parker was commissioned into the engineering branch of the Royal Navy and served on the aircraft carrier HMS Invincible. He became Director (Maritime capability and Transformation) and Controller of the Navy in 2012 and continued as Director (Carrier Strike) at the Ministry of Defence in 2013.

Parker was appointed Companion of the Order of the Bath (CB) in the 2016 Birthday Honours.

References

1963 births
Living people
Royal Navy rear admirals
Companions of the Order of the Bath
People from Cheltenham
Military personnel from Gloucestershire